Walide Khyar (born 9 June 1995) is a French judoka. He competed at the 2016 Summer Olympics in the men's 60 kg event, in which he was eliminated in the second round by Felipe Kitadai.

In 2021, he won the silver medal in his event at the 2021 Judo Grand Slam Antalya held in Antalya, Turkey.

References

External links

 
 
 
 
 

1995 births
Living people
French male judoka
Olympic judoka of France
Judoka at the 2016 Summer Olympics
Judoka at the 2019 European Games
European Games competitors for France
21st-century French people